Big Spring Park is the name of several parks:

Big Spring Park (Cedartown, Georgia)
Big Spring Park (Huntsville, Alabama)
Big Spring Park (Neosho, Missouri)
Big Spring State Park (Texas)
Big Spring State Forest Picnic Area Pennsylvania
Big Spring State Park (disambiguation)

See also 
 Big Spring (disambiguation)